James Thomas Patrick Walsh (September 28, 1943 – February 27, 1998) was an American character actor. His many films include Tin Men (1987), Good Morning, Vietnam (1987), A Few Good Men (1992), Hoffa (1992), Nixon (1995), Sling Blade (1996), Breakdown (1997) and Pleasantville (1998).

Early life
Walsh was born in San Francisco, California, to Mary Louise (née O'Connor) and James Patrick Walsh, who were both of Irish descent. His father was a civilian comptroller in the U.S. Army. He had three siblings: Christopher, Patricia, and Mary. From 1948 until 1962, the family lived in West Germany, where Walsh's father was stationed; they lived in Munich for seven years before moving to Stuttgart. 

Walsh and his brother studied at Clongowes Wood College (a Jesuit school in Ireland) from 1955 until 1961. He then attended the University of Tübingen (Walsh spoke fluent German) for a year before his father died of a brain tumour, after which he and his family moved back to the United States, settling in his mother's native Rhode Island. He completed his studies at the University of Rhode Island, where he majored in sociology and starred in many college theater productions. During this time, he was also active in SDS demonstrations against the Vietnam War. 

After graduating from college in 1967, Walsh worked briefly as a VISTA volunteer in Newport, Rhode Island organizing tenants for the United Tenant Organizations of Rhode Island (UTO) before resigning to pursue his acting career. Prior to becoming an actor, he also worked as a barman, an encyclopedia salesman, a junior high school teacher, a gymnasium equipment salesman, and a reporter. In 1974, he was discovered by a theater director and began working in off-Broadway shows, where he began using the initials "J. T." to avoid confusion with another stage actor named James Walsh.

Career

On stage, Walsh received critical acclaim for his performance as John Williamson in the 1984 U.S. premiere of David Mamet's Glengarry Glen Ross in Chicago and subsequently on Broadway. He did not appear in films until 1983, when he had a minor role in Eddie Macon's Run. Over the next 15 years, he appeared in over 50 feature films, increasingly taking the villain role for which he is well known, such as Sergeant Major Dickerson in Good Morning, Vietnam. On television, he again portrayed an evil character, prison warden Brodeur on the 1995 X-Files episode "The List".

Wishing to show his range as an actor and play good guys, despite being typecast as a villain, he played relatively decent characters in Outbreak and Sniper, and also played the rather sympathetic Marine Lieutenant Colonel Matthew Markinson in A Few Good Men. He played a member of Majestic 12 in the 1996 sci-fi drama series Dark Skies. Walsh notably played real people in three films: journalist Bob Woodward in Wired, Teamsters president Frank Fitzsimmons in Hoffa, and Richard Nixon's domestic advisor John Ehrlichman in Nixon. He was fired from Loose Cannons after completing two days of filming because his co-star Dan Aykroyd had learned of Walsh's involvement in Wired, a biopic of Aykroyd's friend John Belushi to which Aykroyd was hostile. 

The 1997 thriller Breakdown, which featured Walsh as villainous truck driver Warren "Red" Barr, was his last starring film released during his lifetime. In his final year of life, Walsh starred in Hidden Agenda, Pleasantville, and The Negotiator, all of which were dedicated to his memory.

Personal life and death
He married Susan West in 1972 and they had a son, John Alan West (born 1974), who works in film production under the name John West. They divorced in 1982. Walsh lived in Encino, Los Angeles. He was a lifelong Democrat, and an avid reader with a strong interest in metaphysics. 

A heavy smoker, Walsh died of a heart attack in the hospital in La Mesa, California, on February 27, 1998, at the age of 54, after feeling ill and collapsing at the Optimum Health Institute in Lemon Grove. Just a few weeks earlier, Walsh had experienced chest pains and had an EKG test done that was misread as normal.  

In his tribute to Walsh in Time Out New York, Andrew Johnston wrote:

Other
The "Hey It's That Guy!" feature in Fametracker was inspired by him, as he appeared in over 60 films but was not well known by name. The creators expanded upon this idea in 2005 by publishing Hey! It's That Guy!: The Fametracker.com Guide to Character Actors.

Filmography

Film

Television

References

External links
 
 
 J. T. Walsh (1943-1998): Reflections Of A Friend; biographical essay and tribute by Marc Seifer
 
 Bubblegun interview

1943 births
1998 deaths
20th-century American male actors
American expatriates in Ireland
American male film actors
American male stage actors
American male television actors
American people of Irish descent
Male actors from San Francisco
Male actors from Rhode Island
University of Rhode Island alumni
People educated at Clongowes Wood College
University of Tübingen alumni
American expatriates in West Germany
California Democrats
Rhode Island Democrats